Pavesi is an Italian surname.

Notable people
Attilio Pavesi (1910–2011), Italian cyclist
Carlo Pavesi (1923–1995), Italian fencer
Donato Pavesi (1889–1946), Italian racewalker
Eberardo Pavesi (1883–1974), Italian cyclist
Stefano Pavesi (1779–1850), Italian composer

Companies
Carrozzeria Pavesi, a bodywork company founded in Milan by Ernesto Pavesi in 1929.

Italian-language surnames